Maud is an unincorporated community in Allamakee County, Iowa, United States.

History
 Maud got its start as a way station on the railroad. Maud's population was 12 in 1902, and was also 12 in 1925.

References

Unincorporated communities in Allamakee County, Iowa
Unincorporated communities in Iowa